Brendon Terence April (born 20 December 1993 in Wellington) is a South African rugby union player, currently playing with Western Province Premier League club side Durbanville-Bellville. His regular position is winger.

Career

Youth and amateur rugby

April started off his career playing for Boland club side Roses United and often played for them throughout his entire career. He also played for the  side in 2002 and for their U20 side in 2003.

Falcons

He made senior debut during the 2005 Vodacom Cup competition, starting their match against . He also made his Currie Cup debut during the same season, scoring six tries in their First Division campaign. He was regular for them in the 2006 Vodacom Cup, scoring five tries to help the  win the trophy – the first trophy in their history – and also qualify for the 2006 Currie Cup Premier Division, where April failed to score in five appearances.

Griffons, Roses United and Maties

He then returned to former amateur club side Roses United, where he played club rugby for the next few seasons.

In 2008, he was also included in the  side that won the inaugural Varsity Cup competition, starting the first two matches of their season.

Boland Cavaliers

He established himself as a regular starter for his team over the next few seasons and kept up his try-scoring exploits, finishing as the top try scorer for the Cavaliers during the 2012 and 2013 Currie Cup seasons.

He was also the top try-scorer for Roses United at the 2014 SARU Community Cup tournament.

Durbanville-Bellville

In 2015, he joined Western Province club side Durbanville-Bellville and was a member of the squad that won the 2015 SARU Community Cup competition, scoring four tries in seven appearances in the competition.

Personal

He is the older brother of rugby player Garth April.

References

South African rugby union players
Living people
1983 births
Rugby union wings
People from Wellington, Western Cape
Boland Cavaliers players
Falcons (rugby union) players
Griffons (rugby union) players
Rugby union players from the Western Cape